Morimopsini is a tribe of longhorn beetles of the subfamily Lamiinae. It was described by Lacordaire in 1869.

Taxonomy
 Aconodes Pascoe, 1857
 Anerpa Gahan, 1907
 Anexodus Pascoe, 1886
 Apomempsis Pascoe, 1864
 Apomempsoides Breuning, 1950
 Bulbotrachystola Vitali & Yanega, 2019
 Caparmena Sudre & Teocchi, 2002
 Centruropsis Breuning, 1950
 Dolichostyrax Aurivillius, 1911
 Dolopharoides Breuning, 1978
 Dolophrades Bates, 1884
 Dorcadiopsis Müller, 1941
 Echthistatodes Gressitt, 1938
 Falsotrachystola Breuning, 1950
 Haploparmena Aurivillius, 1913
 Kenyavelleda Teocchi, 1999
 Lamidorcadion Pic, 1934
 Lepromoris Pascoe, 1864
 Microdorcadion Pic, 1925
 Mimodorcadion Breuning, 1942
 Mimogrynex Breuning, 1939
 Mimovelleda Breuning, 1940
 Monoxenus Kolbe, 1893
 Morimidius Breuning, 1939
 Morimolamia Breuning, 1954
 Morimonella Podaný, 1979
 Morimopsis Thomson, 1857
 Mycerinodes Kolbe, 1894
 Niphoparmena Aurivillius, 1903
 Niphoparmenoides Breuning, 1978
 Obages Pascoe, 1866
 Opsies Pascoe, 1864
 Pantilema Aurivillius, 1911
 Paramonoxenus Breuning, 1970
 Parmenolamia Breuning, 1950
 Parobages Breuning, 1940
 Paroriaethus Breuning, 1936
 Phrissomidius Breuning, 1939
 Pirulintia Simonetta & Teocchi, 1995
 Protilema Aurivillius, 1908
 Protilemoides Kriesche, 1923
 Pseudhepomidion Breuning, 1936
 Pseudobrimus Breuning, 1936
 Pseudomonoxenus Breuning, 1958
 Sinodorcadion Gressitt, 1939
 Somatovelleda Breuning, 1943
 Spinocentruropsis Minet, 1987
 Stenoparmena Thomson, 1864
 Tuberolamia Breuning, 1940

References

 
Lamiinae